A list of the films produced in the Tamil language film industry in India in the 1930s:

1931

1932

1933

1934 
Source:

1935

1936

1937

1938

1939

References 

1930s
Lists of 1930s films
1930s in Indian cinema
1930s Tamil-language films